St. Theresa's College of Quezon City also called by its acronym STC, is a private Catholic basic education institution for girls (formerly also a higher education institution) run by the Missionary Sisters of the Immaculate Heart of Mary in Quezon City, Metro Manila, Philippines. It was officially established on January 7, 1947 by the ICM Sisters but opened only in June 1947.

STC offers programs from the kindergarten through the elementary and secondary levels. As an ICM school, its educational program draws inspiration from Mother Marie Louise De Meester, Foundress of ICM.

Its students are called “Theresians”, from the name of its patroness St. Teresa of Avila.

Heading the school for the ICM sisters is Sr. Josefina Nebres, the former school directress. Now, Dr. Maria Bayle is the school directress after Sr. Nebres retired from her position.

The school is a member of the Catholic Educational Association of the Philippines (CEAP) and the Philippine Accrediting Association of Schools, Colleges, and Universities (PAASCU).

History
Mother Marie Louise De Meester (born on April 8, 1857 in Roesalare, West Flanders, Belgium) and her novices arrived on the shores of Tagudin, Ilocos Sur on June 21, 1910. Tagudin became the base of the ICM missionary work throughout the Philippines which gave birth to institutions of learning in the country including the different campuses of St. Theresa's College. Mother Marie Louise De Meester founded St. Theresa's College Manila (STCM) in 1915 at the invitation of the Most Reverend Jeremiah James Harty, the first American Archbishop of Manila. World War II wrought havoc on the St. Theresa's College campus in San Marcelino, Manila, leaving it in ruins. The school was re-built and re-opened. It continued to be run by the Belgian Sisters until 1980 when the STCM property was sold to Adamson University.

After World War II, The Tuason family, (Antonio Maria Tuason's (originally "Son Tua") descendants), a prominent mestizo (“mestizo de Sangley” or Chinese mestizo ) family in the Philippines from Old Binondo, donated a block of land to the ICM sisters where STCQC stands today. The donated land is bigger than the San Marcelino campus. The street along the front of the school's campus was named, D. Tuazon (Don Jose Severo Tuason). The parcel of land was part of the Hacienda de Tuason, one of the properties acquired by the Tuazon family during the colonial period. The STCM was a well-known exclusive all girls school attended by mestizas (mixed native and European Spanish ancestry) and their children. The Tuasons' also contributed to rebuilding other schools such as St. Scholastica's College, Manila. After World War II, the school has been re-oriented to focus on primary to secondary education and phasing out its college courses, and opened its doors to accommodate an ever-growing population of students.

In 1933, a sister school, St. Theresa's College of Cebu was established.

In January 1946, a contract was signed which turned over to the ICM sisters ( Missionary Sisters of the Immaculate Heart of Mary ), the property consisting of five blocks, in Sta. Mesa Heights, Quezon City. In accordance with the Philippines' law on properties held by the Catholic Church, it was tax free.

A rudimentary makeshift building used by the U.S. Army, which previously occupied the place, as a garrison to protect the area, was utilized temporarily for the classrooms of St. Theresa's College, Quezon City, and for the quarters of the ICM sisters.
January 7, 1947, marked the establishment of STCQC. However, the school was officially opened in June 1947.

In 1957 St. Theresa's College Baguio City was opened, offering elementary and secondary education. It was one of the two all-girls school in the city. The other was Maryknoll College operated then by the Maryknoll Sisters.

In 1963, the Philippine Orthopedic Center was moved from Mandaluyong, Rizal, to occupy 1/4 of the original 5 block property of STCQC.

In 1972, the ICM Congregation launched a social orientation thrust for all its ministries in education and socio-pastoral, making St. Theresa’s College, Quezon City a pilot school for the implementation of this thrust. An ICM Sister was then commissioned to prepare a program for St. Theresa’s College, Quezon City which called for the school to make available the educational program to deserving families from the lower - middle income group by way of tuition discount, subsidized by Sambayan Educational Foundation, Inc. (SEFI), the funding arm.

In 1980, before STCM was phased out, a kindergarten level was opened to boys, by Sister Redempta Biltereyst, known to her students as Mother Redempta.

In May 2013, President Benigno Aquino III signed the Republic Act No. 10533, otherwise known as "Enhanced Basic Education Act of 2013" into law.

In June 2016 DepEd launched the senior high school (SHS) program nationwide, a new level of basic education consisting of grades 11 and 12 (K-12). Following this, STCQC launched its Senior High School program.

Institution
St. Theresa's College provides both academic, non-academic, and extra-curricular activities for their students' learning.

Grade School Department
The STC QC Grade School is an elementary school for girls. It has facilities and classrooms for students from Kindergarten to Grade 6.

Practicum
The practicum emphasizes experience-based learning. Theories are learned and applied to practical situations or vice versa, through observation, practice, workshops, team research, media demonstrations and educational trips.

Co-curricular activities
Students interested in Sciences, Arts and Writing are invited to join an organization for enthusiasts, called SINAG. In this organization, the students' talents and skills in a particular field are cultivated and developed. SINAG (or Socialized Instructional Activities for the Advanced Group) in Science, Mathematics, Performing Arts, and Creative-Writing helps students enhance their potentials in various subjects.

High School Department
The High School Department is a Catholic college-preparatory school for female students.
The campus features a library, the Instructional Media Center, Biology laboratory, Chemistry laboratory, Physics laboratory, computer laboratories, High School Chapel, cooking rooms, sewing room, canteen and cafeteria, clinic and the covered court.

School traditions

Seal
On a field of gold and blue are imposed the cross and three stars. The blue stands for faithful courage, and the gold proclaims jubilant victory - always - through love. The Latin cross within the seal stands for the victory with Christ over evil. The gold of the cross stands for the love for Christ who died on it and rose from the dead. The three stars stand for the three theological virtues: faith, hope, and charity.

The inscription around the seal reads Virtute, Scientia, Artibus Floreat - which is Latin for "education in and through virtue, science, and the arts."

The seal is a badge showing the mountain peak of Carmel, linked with the school's patron saint, St. Teresa of Avila, the first woman doctor of the Church.

STC Hymn
The lyrics of the STC Hymn was written by Aurea Carballo-Gonzalez (STCM HS '31, COL '34) while music was composed by Angeles Rodriguez (STCM HS '26, COL '33).

Family Council
The Family Council is the official organization of the parents of the students of St. Theresa's College. They are the ones that organize the annual STC Family Day. The Family council celebrated their Golden Jubilee in 2011

Sambayan Educational Foundation, Inc.
The Sambayan Educational Foundation, Inc. or SEFI was organized in 1972 by the Missionary Sisters of the Immaculate Heart of Mary (ICM) and a group of STCQC parents and alumnae which called forth the school to make available the educational program to deserving families from the lower-middle-income group by way of socialized tuition fee. Its main objective is to make available quality education for less privileged but deserving students.

The SEFI program is not a scholarship program. It is a reduced tuition fee scheme for twelve years of schooling from Grade 1 until Grade 12 for qualified lower-middle-income groups. It is perhaps the only such program in existence in the Philippines today. Applicants have to pass a rigorous set of criteria as well as entrance exams to qualify. Once a student has been accepted into the program, a social worker regularly monitors her progress and checks on the family environment.

The initial seed money was provided by the ICM congregation. STCQC parents, alumnae and friends have made substantial contributions to the fund through the years.

Notable alumnae
Aicelle Santos - singer, songwriter, actress
Lydia B. Echauz - former President, Far Eastern University
Marilou Diaz-Abaya - movie director
Maxine Medina - designer, model, beauty pageant titleholder (Completed up to Grade 6 only)
 Dianne Medina - actress, dancer, television host, anchor and part-time model
Mel Tiangco - newscaster
Jessica Zafra - fiction writer, columnist
Jessica Soho - newscaster
Rikki Mathay - former broadcast journalist, philanthropist, Senate Spokesperson
Lisa Macuja-Elizalde - prima ballerina
Margie Moran - Miss Universe 1973 winner
Gemma Cruz-Araneta - Miss International 1964 winner; former Philippine Secretary of Tourism
Leah Navarro - singer and socio-civic member
Loida Nicolas-Lewis - philanthropist, lawyer (St. Theresa's College of Manila)
Patricia Evangelista - writer, host
Korina Sanchez - newscaster
Jannelle So - journalist, broadcaster, TV host
Yayo Aguila - actress
Maggie de la Riva - film actress, former pageant beauty queen

See also
Saint Theresa's College of Cebu
Christ the King College, San Fernando, La Union

Sources
http://www.stcqc.edu.ph
Remembrance St. Theresa's College Manila 1915-1980, published by the STAA Manila, 1st edition 1991, 2nd edition 2004
Esprit de Corps, published by St. Theresa's College Manila

External links
- St Theresa's College, Quezon City Official Website
STAA QC - St. Theresa's College Alumnae Association Quezon City
STAA Manila - St. Theresa's College Alumnae Association Manila official website
- Missionary Sisters of the Immaculate Heart of Mary Philippines
- The Arrival of the ICM Missionaries in the Philippines

References

Catholic elementary schools in Metro Manila
Catholic secondary schools in Metro Manila
Girls' schools in the Philippines
Schools in Quezon City
Educational institutions established in 1947
1947 establishments in the Philippines